By Candlelight is a 1933 American pre-Code comedy film directed by James Whale. The film stars Elissa Landi, Paul Lukas, Nils Asther, and Dorothy Revier. A musical version adapted by Rowland Leigh, Cole Porter,  and Edwin Gilbert premiered in 1938 under the title You Never Know, but was a critical and box office flop that closed after only 78 performances.

Plot
During a European train journey, a nobleman's butler Josef (Paul Lukas) is mistaken for his employer Prince Alfred von Romer (Nils Asther) by a beautiful  woman, Marie (Elissa Landi), and he does nothing to disillusion her. In due course, the Prince himself arrives and is mistaken for his servant.

Cast
Marie -	Elissa Landi
Josef -	Paul Lukas
Prince Alfred von Romer -	Nils Asther
Baroness Louise von Ballin -	Esther Ralston
Count von Rischenheim -	Lawrence Grant
Countess von Rischenheim -	Dorothy Revier
Baron von Ballin -	Warburton Gamble
Ann (The Maid) -	Lois January

Critical reception
The New York Times originally ran a review that called By Candlelight "a pleasantly amusing diversion. It is shallow and somewhat obvious in spots, but its little intrigue is set forth with admirable cunning by James Whale and others...The audience yesterday afternoon chuckled with glee when the Prince in brass buttons brought in the champagne, doing the butler's duties in a meticulous fashion."

In a retrospective review, Dave Kehr of The Chicago Reader described By Candlelight as "a forgotten effort by cult director James Whale" but recommended the film, arguing that "sophisticated comedy, not horror, was probably Whale’s real forte."

Jim Hoberman of The Village Voice concurred, writing that "Whale specialized in comedy as well as horror. Blithely pre-Code, By Candlelight is an upstairs-downstairs bedroom farce, predicated on class privilege and mistaken identity. Where Lubitsch might have been suave; Whale skews the action towards hysteria."

TV Guide called it a "pleasant comedy given a sparkling look by talented, classy director Whale"; while Allmovie wrote, "By Candlelight is chock full of delightfully double-entendre pre-Code dialogue and dextrous directorial touches." The Radio Times said "Universal studios' James Whale, the star director of its famous horror cycle, trespasses here on territory more generally associated with Paramount and Ernst Lubitsch. While not quite up to the rival studio's standard of sophisticated romantic comedies peopled by aristocrats, this is a more than respectably assembled film, well directed and well acted, particularly by Lukas."

Radio adaptation
A one-hour radio adaptation was presented on Lux Radio Theatre on June 9, 1935, featuring Robert Montgomery and Irene Purcell.

External links

References

1933 films
1933 comedy films
American comedy films
American black-and-white films
1930s English-language films
Films set in Monaco
American films based on plays
Films directed by James Whale
Universal Pictures films
Films with screenplays by F. Hugh Herbert
1930s American films